Pan dulce, literally meaning "sweet bread", is the general name for a variety of Mexican pastries. Wheat-based breads were first introduced in Mexico by Spanish colonists, settlers and immigrants; however, Mexican pan dulce as we know it today rose to popularity during the French occupation in the mid 1800s. They are inexpensive treats and are consumed as breakfast and or dinner.

Types

The creative contribution of French baked goods to Mexico's cuisine peaked in the early 20th century during the dictatorship of Porfirio Díaz. Skilled Mexican bakers adopted French techniques to create new bread designs with colorful names. Today it is estimated that there are between 500 and 2,000 types of bread currently produced in Mexico. Among these are: 

Alamar
Almohada
Antaño
Barquillo
Barra para rebanadas
Beso
Bicicletas
Bigote
Bisquet
Bocado
Budín
Burrita
Calabaza
Calvo
Calzón
Canasta
Caracol
Cemita
Chafaldrana
Chamuco
Chicharrón
Chilindrina
Chimistlán
Chirimoya
Chirindolfo
Cocoles
Colchón
Concha
Congal
Coyota
Cuerno de mantequilla
Cuerno de vapor
Donas
Doroteo
Elote
Empanochada
Galletas de coco
Gendarme
Guarapo
Gusano
Gusarapo
Hojaldra
Ladrillo
Manita
Mexicano
Moño de danés
Mundos
Neblina
Nopal
Novia
Ojo de Pancha
Oreja
Pachucos
Pan catarino
Pan de caja
Pan de elote
Pan de feria
Pan de muerto
Pan de pueblo
Pan de pulque
Pan de royal
Pan de yema
Pan decorado con letras
Pan en forma de corazón
Pan en forma de tornillo
Pan mestizo
Pan redondo bordado
Pan redondo o moreliano
Pan típico de nuez
Panquecito
Pechuga
Piedra
Polvorón
Puerquito de piloncillo
Rebanada
Regañada
Reja
Rehiletes
Rieles
Rosca de reyes
Roscas de canela
Soles
Tanas
Tecoyota
Trenza
Yolanda
Yoyos

Besos
A beso (kiss), from Mexico, is made by creating round domes on the top with a drop filling of jam in the middle.

Campechanas
Campechanas are rectangular or round glazed Mexican pastries (referred to as hojaldre, Mexican millefeuille).  It is crisp, flaky, and has a shiny caramel colored finish.  It is a very common pan dulce.

Conchas (shells)

Conchas (shells) are known for their shell-like shape and sugar shell pattern on the top.  This is the most common of a genre of bizcocho (egg dough) that is topped with a plethora of toppings elaborated out of sugar crust.  Although the classic shape is shell-like, it can also be shaped like a snail and the cookie-dough topping can be stamped to be in the pattern of squares as well.  Some are sprinkled with different types of sugar or sesame.  Each shape and presentation has a different name; there are dozens.  Classic colors are chocolate, vanilla, egg, or pink, but they can be made in any food color available.  The dough is classically flavored with vanilla or orange blossom (flor de azahar), and can be mixed with anise seeds or cinnamon.  Other names include arracadas, potosinas, and novias.  The concha is a Mexican creation from the 19th century.  It is not related to Japanese melon pan, but is visually similar. This is one of the most famous Mexican pastries and widely recognized in the United States. It is also referred to as "pan de huevo" (egg bread) in other Latin American countries, such as Chile, where they are eaten during tea time or at the beach. They are known as cemitas in Honduras.  Conchas are known as bizcochos in Spain.

Cuernos (horns)
Cuernos (horns) are a Mexican pastry that is known for their horn-like shape. This pastry has garnered many comparisons to the French croissant.

Empanadas (turnovers)
Empanadas (turnovers) are a pastry more commonly served in Cuba and South America but also have a place in Mexican cuisine. They are filled with meat or other ingredients such as cheese or vegetables of different sorts. They are also filled with fruit such as pumpkin or apple.

Marianas 
Marianas are small vanilla sponge cakes that are coated with raspberry jam and coconut along the outside. The top part of Marianas are usually filled with icing or fruit filling.

Marranitos / cochinitos / puerquitos (little pigs)

Marranitos / cochinitos / puerquitos (little pigs) are pig-shaped pastries sweetened with piloncillo and spiced with cinnamon. The bread has erroneously been called "gingerbread pig" because the finished result looks similar to gingerbread. However, ginger isn't used to make the pastry.

Orejas (ears)
Orejas (ears) are flaky and sweet Mexican pastries that are shaped like an ear and are very common at bakeries. They are very similar to a French Palmier.

Piedras (rocks or stones)
Piedras (rocks or stones) is a pastry made of old bread and is known to be as hard as a rock. Many people eat this with very hot drinks.

Polvorones (wedding cookies)
Polvorones (wedding cookies) are shortbread cookies, often eaten at weddings.

Yoyos (yo-yos)
Yoyos (yo-yos) are a Mexican pastry named after the yo-yo toy, and is shaped exactly like it, but does not have the string. It has a filling which usually consists of raspberry jam.

Religious and seasonal pastries
These special breads are part of the traditional customs that have been around for centuries. The stories behind these special occasional breads derive from religious beliefs, the dominant being Roman Catholic.

Rosca de reyes

 ("kings' crown") is a treat in addition to a gift that is given on Three Kings Day, which is held twelve days after Christmas, the celebration date of the birth of Jesus Christ. This bread is symbolic in many ways, the most illustrative being its round shape which signifies the crown of the Magi. Baked inside is a small white plastic or ceramic figurine which represents the baby Jesus. The hidden baby Jesus symbolizes the secrecy of the location of Jesus as a child. The ruler of Jerusalem, King Herod, upon learning about the birth of the prophesied King of the Jews, ordered that all male infants be killed so that he could keep his crown. Whoever finds the small figurine is obligated to host a party for the celebration of the  –  – which occurs on February 2.

Pan de muerto

 ('bread of the dead') is a special bread that is consumed and offered as a part of the  celebration in October and November. Day of the Dead is a lively and communal commemoration of the dead. The bread takes many different shapes, from skulls to animals to crosses and mummies. The traditional  is shaped like a skull, round, with a little ball at the center top to represent a cranium. Following are the four bones to symbolize the four courses of the universe.  consists of ingredients such as dry yeast, all purpose flour, eggs, butter and salt.

Cultural significance
 is considered to be a Mexican cuisine even though its origins are European. Other countries in Latin America and even Europe have adapted some of Mexico's pastries, but it is in Mexico that the creative new shapes originate. Today, pan dulce is seen in many parts of the United States, especially in places like California and Texas, as a result of migration.

Mexico
In Mexico,  is typically consumed at breakfast or evening supper. It is usually accompanied by hot chocolate, milk (often warm), or coffee, and is dipped into the drink for better taste. It can also be eaten alone.

United States
 can be found in Mexican markets in many U.S. states. Though  may not be consumed as frequently, it is commonly consumed in Latin American homes.

See also

 Latin American cuisine
 List of pastries
 List of sweet breads
 Mexican breads
 Mexican cuisine

References

External links

 
 
 

Mexican breads
Mexican pastries
Sweet breads
Latin American breads